St Peter's Church, Bolton-le-Moors, commonly known as Bolton Parish Church, is a Church of England parish church in Bolton, Greater Manchester, England. The parish church, dedicated to St Peter, is an example of the Gothic Revival style. The church is recorded in the National Heritage List for England as a Grade II* listed building, having been designated in 1974. St Peter's is an active parish church in the Diocese of Manchester and is part of the Bolton deanery and Bolton archdeaconry.

History
The church, on a hill overlooking the River Croal, is the fourth to be built on the site. Until the 1840s the ancient ecclesiastical parish of Bolton-le-Moors covered a large area and was divided into townships, some of which had chapels of ease. The modern parish covers the town centre and its immediate surroundings.

Demolition of the 15th-century church in 1866 revealed several pre-Norman stones under the tower, including a preaching cross in three pieces. Fragments of other crosses and stones from the 11th, 12th and 13th centuries, a sepulchral slab, stone coffin, and the remains of a 14th-century stone female figure, indicate that two earlier churches had existed on the same site, one Anglo Saxon and one Norman.

Little is known of the first two buildings, but the squat, 15th-century church which replaced the Norman structure had an embattled west tower, a chancel, nave, north and south aisles and a south porch which was rebuilt in 1694. Its east window had seven lights. The Chetham and Bradford Chapels occupied the east end of the aisles on either side of the chancel. Galleries were added in the 18th century and the aisle walls were raised and windows inserted to light them. Though the church was modified over the years, the population of Bolton expanded rapidly during the Industrial Revolution and the church, in a poor state of repair, became too small and was demolished. Fragments of stone and other artefacts from the first three buildings are displayed in the museum corner of the present church.

The present church, built between 1867 and 1871, was designed by the Lancaster architect E. G. Paley. It cost £47,000 (equivalent to £ in ), and was paid for by Peter Ormrod, a local cotton spinner and banker, of Halliwell Hall.

Structure

Exterior

The church, built in ashlar sandstone with slate roofs, has a nave with clerestory and north and south aisles, transepts, a chancel with a lady chapel and pipe organ chamber. On the south side of the south aisle is a gabled porch with a wrought-iron screen. The vestry, which was added later at its north east corner, is reminiscent of the chapter houses of pre-Reformation abbeys.

The four-stage tower projects from the west end of the north aisle and has clasping buttresses at each corner which terminate in crocketted finials. There are two-light decorated, lancet windows in the second and third stages, and paired bell-chamber lights at the fourth stage. Its west door is in a moulded archway with polished granite shafts. The door, designed by Hubert Austin, retains its original ornate hammered ironwork door furniture.

The church has a five-bay nave, divided by buttresses with lean-to aisles and a clerestory above. In each bay is a three-light decorated window with tracery. The clerestory has paired windows with ball flower decorations and gargoyles. There are traceried pinnacles at the east end of chancel. There is a seven-light east window in the chancel with lancet windows above it. The north transept has a seven-light window and there is a five-light decorated window in the south transept. The lady chapel to the east of the chancel has two two-light windows to south and a three-light east window.

Fittings and furnishings
The chancel and west end of the nave have encaustic tiled floors by Minton. The octagonal wood panelled pulpit wraps round the northern crossing pier, it has stone base and a wrought iron rail to the stairs. The nave seating, canopied civic stalls and choir stalls are original. Three misericords were saved from the 15th-century church.

Of the eight bells installed when the church opened, five were cast in 1699 by Henry Bagley of Ecton in Northamptonshire and three by Rudhall of Gloucester in 1806. The old bells were replaced by the bells from Saviours Church on Deane Road in 1974. Five new trebles were recast from the old bells by John Taylor & Co and the tenor bell was retained and hung "dead" and is rung electrically when required. The tenor bell is inscribed, "I to the Chvrch the living call And to the grave doe svmmon all Henry Bagley made mee 1699".

An organ built in 1795 was enlarged in 1852 and replaced in 1882 by a new one which reused some of the old pipes. The three-manual organ built by A. G. Hill in 1882, in a case decorated with stylised flowers and angels, was rebuilt in 2008 by Principal Pipe Organs of York. The organ has almost 3,000 internal pipes, the largest 16 feet long and the smallest half an inch.

Vicars of Bolton-le-Moors
The following is a list of the vicars since the Reformation:

 1560–1582: Edward Cockerell
 1582–1593: Alexander Smythe
 1594–1595: John Albright
 1595–1598: Zacharias Saunders
 1598–1625: Ellis Saunderson
 1625–1630: Robert Parke
 1630–1644: William Gregg
 1644–1657: John Harpur
 1657–1662: Richard Goodwin
 1662–1671: Robert Harpur
 1671–1673: Michael Stanford
 1673–1691: John Lever
 1691–1721: Peter Haddon
 1721–1737: Thomas Morrall
 1737–1789: Edward Whitehead
 1789–1793: Jeremiah Gilpin
 1793–1811: Thomas Bancroft

 1811–1817: John Brocklebank
 1817–1857: James Slade
 1857–1886: Henry Powell
 1887–1896: James Augustus Atkinson
 1896–1901: Edwyn Hoskyns
 1902–1909: Henry Henn
 1909–1922: Thomas Alfred Chapman
 1922–1930: Spencer Cecil Carpenter
 1930–1933: Spencer Hayward Elliot
 1933–1948: Walter John Havelock Davidson
 1948–1965: Richard Greville Norburn
 1965–1982: Harold Ormandy Fielding
 1983–1990: Alfred Christopher Hall
 1991–1998: Alan Wolstencroft
 1999–2007: Michael Joseph Williams
 2008–2017: Matthew Thompson
 2018–present: Christopher Andrew Bracegirdle

Directors of Music

William Lonsdale c. 1809–25
Witton Thomas c. 1825–40
John Fawcett, BMus 1840–57
John Aspinall 1857–64
Joseph Varey 1865
John H. L. Glover 1865–67
Miss S. Warbreck 1867–69
William Best 1869–89
Walter J. Lancaster, BMus, FRCO, LRAM 1889–1947
George Fisher, BMus, FRCO, LRAM 1947–52
Arthur M. Stanier, LRAM, ARCO 1952–56
P. A. S. Stevens, BSc, BMus 1957–58
William Morgan, BA, FRCO 1959–86
Kevin Morgan, BA, PhD, FRCO, LRAM 1986–96
Martin Bussey, MA 1996–2000
Stephen H. Carleston, MA, FRCO (Chm) 2000–09
Michael J. Pain, MA, FRCO, LRAM, ARCM since 2009

Interior

See also

 List of churches in Greater Manchester
 Listed buildings in Bolton
 List of ecclesiastical works by E. G. Paley

References

Citations

Bibliography

External links

Grade II* listed churches in Greater Manchester
Church of England church buildings in Greater Manchester
Saint Peter's Church
Churches completed in 1871
19th-century Church of England church buildings
Church buildings by E. G. Paley
Saint Peter's Church